Home Work Soul is the fourth studio album by German recording artist Max Mutzke. It was released by Raab Records and Warner Music Group on 24 September 2010 in German-speaking Europe.

Track listing

Charts

Release history

References

External links
MaxMutzke.de — Official website

2010 albums
Max Mutzke albums
Warner Records albums